Resurrection is the fourth studio album by Chimaira, released on March 6, 2007.  Debuting at number 42 on the Billboard 200 charts, Resurrection shipped about 16,000 copies sold in its first week. The album was released in two forms: a regular version, and a limited edition version with different cover artwork and a DVD documentary of the making of the album. Chimaira's first album with Ferret Music since leaving Roadrunner Records, Resurrection features original drummer Andols Herrick who rejoined the group shortly before the writing process. Resurrection is also the first Chimaira album to feature some additional backing vocals by keyboardist Chris Spicuzza.

The international edition issued by Nuclear Blast was issued in a digipak along with the DVD documentary. However, the cover artwork was the standard one.

There's also a tin box limited to 500 copies from Nuclear Blast Germany, that includes the album with the DVD, plus six pictures of the band and a numbered authenticity certificate.

The title track appears on the soundtrack for the video game Saint's Row 2.

The album is also listed on Metal Storm's top 100 metalcore albums.

Track listing

Personnel
Chimaira
 Mark Hunter – lead vocals, rhythm guitar, keyboards, theremin, samplers
 Rob Arnold – lead guitar
 Chris Spicuzza – keyboards, backing vocals
 Jim LaMarca – bass
 Matt DeVries – rhythm guitar
 Andols Herrick – drums
Additional musicians 
Jason Suecof – additional keyboards and samples
Steve Steverson – additional vocals on "Worthless"
Production
Produced by Jason Suecof at Audiohammer Studios
Mixed, engineered and tracked drums by Andy Sneap at Backstage Studios
Additional engineering by Mark Lewis
Mastered by Ted Jensen at Sterling Sound
Artwork by Dennis Sibeijn
Photography by Todd Bell

References

2007 albums
Chimaira albums
Ferret Music albums
Nuclear Blast albums
Albums produced by Jason Suecof